An outcast is someone who is rejected or cast out, as from home or society or in some way excluded, looked down upon, or ignored. In common English speech, an outcast may be anyone who does not fit in with normal society, which can contribute to a sense of isolation.

History

In Ancient Greece, the Athenians had a procedure known as ostracism in which all citizens could write a person's name on a shard of broken pottery (called ostraka) and place it in a large container in a public place. If an individual's name was written a sufficient number of times, he was ostracized—banished from the city for ten years. This was normally practiced against individuals who had behaved in some way that offended the community.

India
Outcasts, in the India caste system, are individuals or a group that for some reason were rejected by any other caste. It is contrary to caste system, where even pariahs have their own caste. Foreigners not ruled by the Indian nobility in India and all foreigners were sometimes perceived as outcastes and untouchables.

Exiles
To be exiled is to be away from one's home (i.e., city, state or country), while either being explicitly refused permission to return or being threatened with imprisonment or death on return. It can be a form of punishment. Exile can also be a self-imposed departure from one's homeland. Self-exile can be a protest by the person who claims it, or done to avoid persecution or legal matters (tax, criminal allegations, or otherwise), through shame, repentance, or to isolate oneself in order to devote time to a particular thing. Article 9 of the Universal Declaration of Human Rights states that, "No one shall be subjected to arbitrary arrest, detention or exile."

In the Bible
In the Old Testament, Ishmael, the son of Abraham, was cast out after the birth of Isaac, his half-brother, who is considered the forebear of the Israelites. Genesis 16:12 of the Bible prophesies Ishmael's life as an outcast: "And he will be a wild man; his hand will be against every man, and every man's hand against him; and he shall dwell in the presence of all his brethren."

See also

 Anthropology
 Begging
 Bitlaha (applied in south Asia)
 Burakumin
 Cagot
 Castaway
 Dalit also called outcaste
 Deviancy
 Hobo
 Leatherman
 Marooning
 Nomad
 Ostracism
 Outlaw
 Persona non grata
 Social stigma
 Squatting
 Untouchability
 Vagrancy

References

External links

 Abstract  zoological
 wandervogel
 definition of friction
 outcastpress poetry and accounts1
  ostracon of Thebes@digitalegypt
 Search.ku.dk
 Wku.edu
 People.wku.edu
 Stlawu.edu
 Openlibrary.org
 Booksfactory.com

Interpersonal relationships
Social rejection
Shunning
Rebels